Bad Banks is a German-Luxembourgish television series first aired in February 2018. In March 2018, it was renewed for a second season. In the U.S., the series was acquired by Hulu.

Production 

Production was carried out by Federation Entertainment and the first season was filmed in Berlin, Frankfurt am Main, London and Luxembourg.

Release 

The first series consisting of six episodes was premiered in Berlin in February 2018 and broadcast on ARTE on March 2, 2018. Subsequently, U.S. network Hulu acquired the series. In August 2018, the series was released in the Netherlands on the channel AVROTROS. The series is also available on Netflix in Germany, Luxembourg, Netherlands, Switzerland and France. Series 1 & 2 are both available in the UK from Channel 4 / Walter Presents. The series is also available in Poland from TVP and on CBC Gem in Canada.

Cast 
</onlyinclude>

</onlyinclude>

Episodes

Season 1 (2018)
</onlyinclude></onlyinclude>

Season 2 (2020) 
</onlyinclude></onlyinclude>

References

External links 
 

Serial drama television series
Grimme-Preis for fiction winners
German-language television shows
2018 German television series debuts
Luxembourgish-language television shows
Luxembourgish television series
Television shows set in Luxembourg
Television shows set in Germany